U Sports football is the highest level of amateur play of Canadian football and operates under the auspices of U Sports (formerly Canadian Interuniversity Sport). Twenty-seven teams from Canadian universities are divided into four athletic conferences, drawing from the four regional associations of U Sports: Canada West Universities Athletic Association, Ontario University Athletics, Réseau du sport étudiant du Québec, and Atlantic University Sport. At the end of every season, the champions of each conference advance to semifinal bowl games; the winners of these meet in the Vanier Cup national championship.

The origins of North American football can be traced here, where the first documented game was played at University College at the University of Toronto in 1861. A number of U Sports programs have been in existence since the origins of the sport. It is from these Canadian universities that the game now known as Canadian football began. In 1874, McGill University (Montreal) challenged Harvard University (Cambridge, Massachusetts) to a series of games.

The Grey Cup, the championship trophy of the professional Canadian Football League (CFL) since its founding in the 1950s, was originally contested by teams from the University of Toronto and Queen's University and other amateur teams since 1909. Many U Sports players have gone on to professional careers in the CFL and elsewhere; a number are drafted annually in the Canadian College Draft. In 2021, there were a record 208 U Sports alumni on CFL rosters.

Season structure

Regular season

The regular season is nine to ten weeks long, depending on the conference, and, as of 2019, opens on the weekend before the Labour Day weekend. Teams play eight regular season games and regular season games are in-conference with exhibition (pre-season) games being played between conferences. Throughout the season, there are featured homecoming and rivalry games in most regions. Following the conclusion of the regular season, the Hec Crighton Trophy is awarded annually to the Most Valuable Player of U Sports football.

Playoffs
After the regular season, single elimination playoff games are held between the top teams in each conference to determine conference champions. In the Atlantic conference, the top three teams qualify for the playoffs with the first place team receiving a bye. In the Canada West and Quebec conferences, the top four teams qualify for the playoffs. In Ontario, the top six teams qualify with the top two teams receiving playoff byes to the next round. Because the OUA teams have conference playoffs that last three weeks instead of two, the first round of the post-season in the OUA occurs during the same week that each of the other three conferences are playing their last regular season games. Each conference has its own championship trophy; the Hardy Trophy in the West, the Yates Cup in Ontario, the Dunsmore Cup in Quebec and the Jewett Trophy in the Atlantic conference. The conference champions proceed to national semifinal bowl games: the Mitchell Bowl and the Uteck Bowl. The participant conferences of each bowl are determined several years in advance on a rotating basis.

Vanier Cup

The winners of each bowl game meet in the Vanier Cup national championship, first established in 1965 and named in honour of Governor General Georges Vanier. The game was held in Toronto every year through 2003 when host conference bids were first accepted, yielding a move to Hamilton for 2004 and 2005, followed by Saskatoon in 2006. Quebec City, Vancouver, and Montreal have since hosted Vanier Cup games.

Expansion
There have been efforts at establishing new varsity football programs at institutions that currently do not have teams. A group of alumni from Carleton University in Ottawa successfully revived that school's program which returned in 2013. The team is a member of the Ontario University Athletics conference of U Sports, returning football to Carleton University after a 15-year absence.

The Université de Moncton investigated a possible football program in 2011, due to the construction of Moncton Stadium in 2010. In May 2011, the athletics department submitted a feasibility report to the school's president and are based part of their decision upon how the fans in Moncton received the Uteck Bowl in 2011. The 2011 Uteck Bowl was not well supported in Moncton, and there has been little support for a team since. 

A club team league, the Atlantic Football League, features four-to-five universities, depending on the season. There is hope this may lead to varsity teams featured at some of these schools.

Following their successful application to become full members of the Canada West Universities Athletic Association, the UBC Okanagan Heat explored the feasibility of starting their own football program, partnered with the CJFL's Okanagan Sun. UBCO would have partnered with the Sun in much the same way that the University of Regina was paired with the Prairie Football Conference's Regina Rams.

However, UBC-O lacked a stadium on campus. The Kelowna city-owned Apple Bowl Stadium did not meet the guidelines required for entry into Canada West football after a conference site visit in 2014.

The University of Quebec at Trois-Rivières explored the possibility of adding a football program with the launch planned for the 2017 season. The program would have been similar to Carleton University's in that there would be private funding from football alumni, but operated by shareholders. As of April 2015, $800,000 of the required $3 million had been raised in support of the varsity sport at UQTR. The capacity of the football stadium would then be increased from 2000 to 6270 seats. However, the UQTR Board of Regents refused to commit to the proposal. The UQTR Patriotes previously fielded a senior varsity team from 1971 to 1973 and 1977 to 1979.

Proposed interconference consortium 
In February 2015, businessman David Dube (an alumnus and supporter of the Saskatchewan Huskies) and Jim Mullin announced a proposal for a consortium known as the "Northern 8", which would organize interconference games between its member schools. Dube felt that this plan could help improve the prominence of CIS football on a national basis outside of the post-season (which, as of the 2014 season, was the only period of the season that featured nationally televised CIS games), as it would allow a nationally televised package of regular-season games to be sold to a major broadcaster. The Northern 8 would be structured as a non-profit corporation and would subsidize production costs for its telecasts: profits would be distributed to non-member schools. It would start with eight teams but could expand to 10 in the future. The Canada West conference backed the proposal. The OUA, RSEQ and AUS showed concerns for the plan due to travel costs and their effects on standings and rejected the plan.

Teams

Awards and the annual All-Canadian Team
There are post-season awards for on-the-field excellence. The players deemed to be the best at each position are named to the annual All-Canadian Football Team as first or second team players.

Additionally there are a number of individual awards for categories like "best defensive player".

Professional advancement

U Sports players in the CFL
Many players from U Sports football have become professional athletes with most of them playing in the Canadian Football League. Opening Day of the 2015 CFL season saw a record 199 U Sports football players on rosters around the League. The most recent CFL season, 2021, featured 208 former U Sports football players on CFL teams' rosters on opening day.

CFL Draft
The following is a list of recent numbers from the CFL Draft, which is an annual eight-round event with a current maximum of 74 players drafted. From 1997 to 2012 the CFL Draft had six rounds of selections and from 2013 to 2015 it had seven rounds. From 2002 to 2005, the CFL had nine teams, then reverted to eight teams from 2006 to 2013, and then was back to its current number of nine teams in 2014. The high-water mark of 60 players from the U Sports drafted was recorded in the 2022 CFL Draft, which was the most since 1978.

U Sports players in the NFL
As of 2021, U Sports had produced 38 players who have earned a spot on an NFL roster (including four who did not play a regular season game; players listed in chronological order by entry year in NFL):

 1945 Joe Krol, Western Ontario, K/RB.
 1947 Les Lear, Manitoba, OG/OT.
 1960 Bill Crawford, UBC, OG.
 1965 Jim Young, Queen's, RB/R.
 1976 Brian Fryer, Alberta, R.
 1979 Ken Clark, Saint Mary's, P.
 1986 Mike Schad, Queen's, OG.
 1987 Brian Belway, Calgary, DE.
 1987 Dave Sparenberg, Western Ontario, OG.
 1987 Brant Bengen, UBC and Idaho, WR.
 1988 Dean Dorsey, Toronto, K.
 1992 Tyrone Williams, Western Ontario, WR.
 1995 Tim Tindale, Western Ontario, RB.
 1995 Mark Montreuil, Concordia, CB.
 1995 Mark Hatfield, Bishop's, OL.
 1996 Grayson Shillingford, UBC, SB.
 1998 Jerome Pathon, Acadia & U. of Washington, R.
 2000 J. P. Darche, McGill, LS/LB.
 2001 Randy Chevrier, McGill, LS/DE.
 2003 Israel Idonije, Manitoba, DL.
 2004 Steve Morley, Saint Mary's, OG/OT.
 2006 Daniel Federkeil, Calgary, DE.
 2006 Jon Ryan, Regina, K.
 2008 Samuel Giguère, Sherbrooke, WR
 2009 Vaughn Martin, Western Ontario, DL.
 2010 Cory Greenwood, Concordia, LB
 2010 Joel Reinders, Waterloo, OT
 2011 Matt O'Donnell, Queen's OT
 2012 Akiem Hicks, Regina, DT
 2013 Stefan Charles, Regina, DT
 2014 Henoc Muamba, St.FX, LB
 2014 David Foucault, Montreal, OL
 2014 Laurent Duvernay-Tardif, McGill, OL
 2016 David Onyemata, Manitoba, DL
 2017 Antony Auclair, Laval, TE
 2019 Tevaughn Campbell, Regina, DB
 2020 Dakoda Shepley, UBC, C
 2021 Lirim Hajrullahu, Western, PK

NFL Draft
There have been 13 U Sports players drafted into the National Football League with Deane Leonard being the most recent.

See also
 
 Canadian Junior Football League, Quebec Junior Football League
 Football Canada
 Canadian football
 Canadian Football League
 College football
 U Sports
 Canadian Collegiate Athletic Association
 Comparison of Canadian and American football
 CEGEP
 List of Canadian Football stadia by capacity

References

External links
 
 A History of Canadian University Football

 
3
1961 establishments in Canada